PERM is a stored-program-controlled electronic computer, built in Munich under the auspices of Hans Piloty and Robert Sauer 1952–1956. Some jokingly called it Pilotys erstes RechenMonster ('Piloty's first calculating monster'). It weighed several tons.

The machine is now displayed in the informatics (computer science) exhibition of the Deutsches Museum München.

References

External links
 Google translation (may not show pictures)

Early computers